Craig Ross is an American guitarist.

Craig Ross may also refer to:
 Craig Ross (Canterbury cricketer) (born 1980), New Zealand cricketer
 Craig Ross (Northern Districts cricketer) (born 1970), New Zealand cricketer
 Craig Ross (footballer) (born 1990), English footballer
 Craig Ross (darts player) (born 1970), darts player from New Zealand
 Craig Ross Jr., American film and television director